Jan Krejčí (born 27 September 1992) is a Czech chess grandmaster.

Chess career
Born in 1992, Krejčí earned his international master title in 2009 and his grandmaster title in 2011. He won the Pardubice Open in 2017. He is the No. 5 ranked Czech player as of September 2018.

References

External links

1992 births
Living people
Chess grandmasters
Czech chess players